International Portland Select Football Club is a semi-professional soccer club based in Portland, Oregon playing in the National Premier Soccer League.

History

In late 2013, the NPSL announced Spartans Futbol Club as an expansion team ahead of the 2014 season in the then-newly created Northwest Conference. The rest of the conference was made up of Gorge FC, Inter United FC, and Seattle Sporting FC. The team won the inaugural Northwest Conference title by going undefeated through 12 regular season games (10-2-0). The Spartans fell in their first playoff game against Sonoma County Sol, 3–1.

Ahead of the 2017 season Portland announced a new partnership with French side FC Mulhouse. The partnership included an officially re-branded of the team as FC Mulhouse Portland and allowed both sides to share "curriculum, methodology and marketing strategies."

As a top finishing team from NPSL in 2019, Mulhouse qualified for the 2019 U.S. Open Cup via an at-large bid. In its first tournament game, the team traveled to California to face local qualifying side Cal FC. Freddie Braun scored the only goal for Portland as the team lost, 5–1.

In January 2020, the NPSL announced that FCM had merged with local amateur side International Portland Select Football Club and re-branded to follow suit. IPS had previously attempted to qualify for the U.S. Open Cup in 2016, 2017, 2018, 2019, and 2020 coming within one win of qualifying on two occasions (2016, 2019).

Stadium
The team plays at Kiggins Bowl Stadium in Vancouver, Washington.

Roster

Year-by-year

Honors
National Premier Soccer League
 Northwest Conference Champions: 2014
 West Region Champions: 2018

References

External links
 

Association football clubs established in 1996
National Premier Soccer League teams
Soccer clubs in Oregon
1996 establishments in Oregon
Sports teams in Portland, Oregon
Soccer clubs in Washington (state)
Sports in Vancouver, Washington